East Glacier Park (Blackfeet: , "Big Tree Lodge") is an unincorporated community and census-designated place (CDP) in Glacier County, Montana, United States. The population was 363 on the 2010 United States Census.

The Great Northern Railway platted the community of Midvale in the 1890s. The town name was eventually changed to Glacier Park and officially became East Glacier Park in 1949.

History

2022 attack
On July 19, 2022, 37-year-old Derick Amos Madden rammed his pickup truck (a Toyota Tacoma) into a Syracuse, New York, family in East Glacier Park Village. After crashing, he emerged with a shotgun and fatally shot the father and his 18-month-old daughter. He also critically injured the mother and the sister-in-law, the latter of whom had been in a relationship with Madden. Madden, who also used a knife in the attack, was subsequently killed by the sister-in-law when she fought back. Two other children in the family survived uninjured.

Geography

Gallery

Climate
East Glacier's climate is borderline Subarctic / Humid Continental, with warm summers, and winters generally beginning in November and lasting into March, bringing cold temperatures and over 176 inches of snowfall annually.

Demographics

As of the census of 2000, there were 396 people, 148 households, and 101 families residing in the CDP. The population density was 90.9 people per square mile (35.1/km2). There were 219 housing units at an average density of 50.3 per square mile (19.4/km2). The racial makeup of the CDP was 43.43% White, 0.25% African American, 51.77% Native American, 1.26% from other races, and 3.28% from two or more races. Hispanic or Latino of any race were 0.76% of the population.

There were 148 households, out of which 35.1% had children under the age of 18 living with them, 50.7% were married couples living together, 14.2% had a female householder with no husband present, and 31.1% were non-families. 23.0% of all households were made up of individuals, and 4.1% had someone living alone who was 65 years of age or older. The average household size was 2.68 and the average family size was 3.27.

In the CDP, the population was spread out, with 32.1% under the age of 18, 5.6% from 18 to 24, 28.8% from 25 to 44, 26.5% from 45 to 64, and 7.1% who were 65 years of age or older. The median age was 36 years. For every 100 females, there were 93.2 males. For every 100 females age 18 and over, there were 92.1 males.

The median income for a household in the CDP was $37,417, and the median income for a family was $39,250. Males had a median income of $32,250 versus $27,917 for females. The per capita income for the CDP was $17,318. About 14.3% of families and 14.1% of the population were below the poverty line, including 17.3% of those under age 18 and 26.8% of those age 65 or over.

Infrastructure

Transportation
The East Glacier Park Amtrak Station is open seasonally during the spring, summer and fall, served by the Empire Builder between Chicago and Seattle/Portland. During the winter the stop is at Browning, Montana, just east of East Glacier Village.  Glacier Park International Airport at Kalispell is the closest airport.

Emergency services
The East Glacier Volunteer Fire Department was founded in 1968. Today, it consists of around 18 volunteers who help protect the village and surrounding area from the threat of wildland fire.

See also
West Glacier, Montana

References

Census-designated places in Glacier County, Montana
Census-designated places in Montana